The giant sawbelly (Hoplostethus gigas) is a medium-sized deep-sea fish species belonging to the slimehead family (Trachichthyidae). It is found along the western and southern coasts of Australia and near New Zealand. It can reach sizes of up to  SL.

References

giant sawbelly
Fish of Australia
Fish of New Zealand
Marine fish of Southern Australia
Marine fish of Western Australia
giant sawbelly